Nalinidhar Bhattacharya (4 December 1921 – 1 September 2016) was an Indian poet and literary critic from Assam. He won the Sahitya Akademi Award for his collection Mahat Oitijhya in 2002.

His younger brother Birendra Kumar Bhattacharya was also a writer, who was a Sahitya Academy award and Jnanpith Award recipient.

Literary works
His published works include Serasalir Malita, Noni Asane Gharat, Mohot Aitaijya, etc.

Awards
 Soviet Land Nehru Award (1983)
 Mrinalini Devi Award
 Sahitya Akademi award (2002)
 Indian Language Parishad award
 Chagganlal Jain award
 Assam Valley Literary Award (2006) etc.
 Sahityacharya honour by the Asam Sahitya Sabha (2010) 
 ‘Papari Kabi’ Ganesh Gogoi award

See also
 List of Assamese-language poets
 List of Sahitya Akademi Award winners for Assamese
 Assamese literature

References

External links
 The angry boy in the woods, a poem of the author at bipuljyoti.in.
 Autobiography at xahitya.org website.

1921 births
2016 deaths
Assamese-language poets
Poets from Assam
Writers from Northeast India
Recipients of the Sahitya Akademi Award in Assamese
Recipients of the Assam Valley Literary Award
Indian male poets
20th-century Indian poets
21st-century Indian poets
20th-century Indian male writers
21st-century Indian male writers
Writers from Assam